Mrákov is a municipality and village in Domažlice District in the Plzeň Region of the Czech Republic. It has about 1,100 inhabitants.

Administrative parts
Villages of Mlýneček, Nový Klíčov, Smolov and Starý Klíčov are administrative parts of Mrákov.

References

Villages in Domažlice District
Chodové